Baidyabati railway station is located on the Howrah–Bardhaman main line, in Hooghly district, West Bengal, India. It serves Baidyabati town.

References

Railway stations in Hooghly district
Howrah railway division
Kolkata Suburban Railway stations
Serampore